United States v. Solon, 596 F.3d 1206 (10th Cir. 2010), was a case in which Nathaniel Solon, a resident of Casper, Wyoming, was convicted for possession of child pornography. The case became known in the media for irregularities in the process, and suspicions (affirmed by the defendant) that the material was introduced by malware on the computer. There were other people accused of similar crimes, who were later acquitted, but Solon was never exonerated.

Background
Nathaniel Solon was charged on January 18, 2007, by the indictment with possessing child pornography. On October 2, 2007, he pleaded guilty. When he came back for another hearing on January 8, 2008, however, Solon stated that he was an innocent man, and the only reason that he had pleaded guilty in the first place was because he believed that he did not have the financial resources to hire an expert witness to investigate his defense. In regard to his explanation, the court appointed him a private attorney to represent him. With the court's approval, Solon was able to request an expert witness, with an investigation budget of $20,000 supplied by the court.

See also
Frameup

References

External links
Framed for Child Porn, a website collecting similar cases, inspired on this case.

American people convicted of child pornography offenses
United States computer case law
United States Court of Appeals for the Tenth Circuit cases
United States due process case law
United States Internet case law
2010 in United States case law
Child pornography law
Casper, Wyoming
Malware